This list of Labrador Retrievers covers notable individual dogs that belong to this breed. The Labrador retriever is the most popular breed of dogs (by registered ownership) in both the United States and the United Kingdom. The breed is exceptionally affable, intelligent, energetic and good natured, making them excellent and popular pets, companions and working dogs. They have a high work ethic  Common working roles for Labradors include: hunting, tracking and detection, disabled-assistance, carting, and therapy work. Approximately 60–70% of all guide dogs in the United States are Labradors.

As both the most popular breed by registered ownership and also the most popular breed for service dogs in several countries, there have been many notable and famous Labradors since the breed was recognized.

List of famous dogs

Assistance dogs

 Cora, a yellow lab golden retriever cross, is a Guide Dog for the Blind in England who holds the Freedom of the City of London. Cora is the first and only Free Dog of the City of London since the recognition ceremony was first recorded in 1237 in the year of King Henry III. The Freedom of the City of London is awarded to people who have achieved success, recognition or celebrity in their chosen field. The recognition of the Freedom of the City of London was unanimously extended to Cora at Guildhall in June 2017 alongside her owner who is a solicitor member of  City of London Solicitors Livery Company.
 Endal, a service dog in England. Among other distinctions, "the most decorated dog in the world" (including "Dog of the Millennium" and the PDSA's Gold Medal for Animal Gallantry and Devotion to Duty), the first dog to ride on the London Eye, the first dog known to work a 'chip and pin' ATM card, and the first dog to place a human being in the recovery position without training following a blackout.  some three hundred camera crews from several countries have interviewed Endal and his owner/handler, and a film of a year in his life is in production.
 Lucy, David Blunkett's best known guide dog, who once vomited in the British House of Commons during a Parliamentary speech.
Sully, served with former US President George H. W. Bush during the last six months of his life; noted for his role during the president's funeral.
 Timber, named "Heroic Guide Dog of the Year" by Guide Dogs for the Blind (UK) in 2005, after saving the life of his owner, Arthur Griffiths, during a traffic collision.
 Omar Riviera's yellow Labrador guide dog "Dorado". Riviera was on an upper floor of the Twin Towers at the time of the September 11, 2001 attacks. Despite extreme confusion, noise and panic, Dorado led Riviera down 70 stories just before Tower 1 collapsed. According to media reports, "Riviera even tried to release Dorado so the dog could have a better chance at survival, but found the dog would not leave his side".

Police, military, rescue and detection dogs

 Jake, a black Labrador who became a national canine hero after burrowing through "white-hot, smoking debris"  in 2001 during the September 11 attacks in search of survivors at Ground Zero.  He helped search for Hurricane Katrina victims in 2005. As a puppy, Jake was abandoned with a broken leg and dislocated hip, but as an adult became one of fewer than 200 U.S. government-certified rescue dogs, and described by a member of the 9/11 Federal search and rescue teams as "a world class rescue dog". He died of cancer at age 12 in July 2007.
 Lucky and Flo, twin Black Labrador counterfeit detection dogs who became famous in 2007 for "sniffing out nearly 2 million unlicensed counterfeit DVDs" for the Motion Picture Association of America while on a 6-month secondment to Malaysia in 2007. The two later repeated a similar feat in several Queens, New York stores. Following the $multi-million 6-arrest Malaysian detection, they became the first dogs to be awarded Malaysia's "outstanding service award", and software pirates were stated to have put a £30,000 contract out for their lives.
 Sabi, an Australian special forces explosives detection dog that spent almost 14 months missing in action (MIA) in Afghanistan before being recovered safe and well in 2009.
 Sadie, a black Labrador who saved the lives of dozens of soldiers in Afghanistan by detecting a bomb. Recipient of the Dickin Medal, the animal equivalent of the Victoria Cross.
 Zanjeer, a detection dog who detected arms and ammunition used in 1993 Mumbai (Bombay) serial explosions. Zanjeer was born on January 7, 1992, and was inducted into the Bomb Detection and Disposal Squad on December 29, 1992. He was trained at the Dog Training Centre of the Criminal Investigation Department in Pune. During his service, his haul was excellent. He helped recover 57 country-made bombs, 175 petrol bombs, 11 military bombs, 242 grenades and 600 detonators. His biggest contribution to the police force and the city was the detection of 3,329 kg of RDX. He also helped detect 18 Type-56 rifles and five 9mm pistols. He died at a veterinary hospital in Parel.
 Frida, Mexican rescue dog, retired in 2019. Took part in 53 operations in various Central American countries, saving 12 lives and locating 40 bodies. Retirement marked by a ceremony by the Mexican Naval Canine Unit attended by deputy minister Eduardo Redondo, while murals and a bronze statue of her have been created in various places.

Other heroic labs
Willie, who saved his friend, John Stenglein, from a wolf attack at a logging camp near on April 26, 2000, in Icy Bay, Alaska. John and an older boy were playing near the edge of a logging camp when a wolf appeared and chased the boys, attacking John when he fell and dragging him and toward the woods.  He was saved by his friend's Labrador retriever, Willie, followed by a group of people, and then John's father arrived and shot the wolf. The wolf was found to have been neither sick nor starving, but habituated to the presence of people. John received 19 laceration and puncture wounds on the back, legs, and buttocks.

Pet dogs

 Buddy, U.S. President Bill Clinton's Labrador, and Seamus, Clinton's other Labrador, received for Father's Day
 Marley, "The World's Worst Dog", featured in journalist John Grogan's autobiographical book Marley & Me, adapted into a 2008 comedy drama film of the same name
 Koni, Russian President Vladimir Putin's Labrador Retriever
 Widgeon, Prince William's black Labrador.

Field (working) dogs
 King Buck (1948–1962) successfully completed an unprecedented 63 consecutive series in the National Championship Stake and was the National Retriever Field Trial Club champion for two successive years (in 1952 and 1953), which accomplishment was not duplicated for nearly 40 years. He was also the first dog to appear on a United States Fish and Wildlife Service Duck stamp (1959), which always featured a water fowl.
 Blind of Arden (born c. 1934),Life magazine December 12, 1938: Cover - Labrador Retriever, Blind of Arden". Inside cover text reads: "The dog on this week's cover is Blind of Arden, who won the No. 1 U.S. retriever stake of the year on November 21, had his picture taken at Southampton by LIFE photographer George Karger." and stated to be 4 years old at the time. first dog to appear on the cover of Life (1938), also winning the No.1 competition at the time, the open all-age stake of the Long Island Retriever Club, with a "remarkable" blind recovery.
 NFC-AFC San Joaquin Honcho won the 1976 National Field Trial Championship and accumulated 142 All-age points during his competitive career. He was owned and trained by the famed retriever trainer, Judy Aycock, who purchased him on recommendation from the retriever legend Rex Carr.
 NFC AFC Storm's Riptide Star, or "Rascal," was the first chocolate lab to win the National Field Trial Championship.  He was the 1996 National Field Trial Champion. He was handled by Mike Lardy. He was also a finalist in the 1998 National Open.

Fiction, TV, books, films and media
 Norman Bridwell's Clifford the Big Red Dog is a giant red Labrador Retriever.
 Bat, a blind Black Labrador mix, plays a role in the manga/anime Ginga Densetsu Weed
 Bouncer and Jake (a black lab), from Neighbours
 Brandeis, a Muppet dog on Sesame Street who finds work as a mobility assistance dog. The puppet appears in later episodes, where it is featured in one of several roles which call for a generic dog.
 Brian Griffin from the animated sitcom Family Guy is a white Labrador Retriever. He is highly anthropomorphized (he drinks dry martinis and drives a Toyota Prius), however he still exhibits many traits which are commonly associated with dogs (for example he cannot resist chasing a ball).
 Brown, a Labrador Retriever in Rule of Rose
 Denmark, a sentient Labrador retriever who is one of the two companions in Castaways of the Flying Dutchman, a series by Brian Jacques
 Dolly, a white Labrador who acted in Korean movies Hearty Paws, Hearty Paws 2, and Blind
 Didier, a Labrador who is transformed into a human form, portrayed by the French actor Alain Chabat, in the film Didier
 Digger is a Labrador retriever puppy in Big Barn Farm
 Elsie, a black Labrador mix featured in the documentary Street Dogs of South Central
 Gus, Dr. Joe Gannon's yellow Labrador retriever on Medical Center
 Jet (f.k.a. Bootsy), briefly adopted by the fictional detective genius Nero Wolfe in Rex Stout's 1954 novella Die Like a Dog
 Jordan, belonging to KVBC's chief meteorologist in Las Vegas. He was a local favorite to residents and had many minutes of fame on the air throughout his 13 years of life.
 Krypto, Superman's dog, is portrayed as a white Labrador.
 Labramon is a titular character on Digimon which is based on the Labrador Retriever breed.
 Luath, from The Incredible Journey
 Little Boo, a therapy dog assigned to Big Boo in Orange Is the New Black, is a Labrador
 Merle is a Lab mix featured in Ted Kerasote's book Merle's Door.  It follows the life of the dog that Kerasote found on a canoe trip in the Tetons, until Merle's passing and the dog's free range life in a small Wyoming town.
 Orson, a Labrador mix who is a major, semi-sentient character in Fear Nothing by Dean Koontz
 Quill, a guide-dog for the blind whose life is followed in the film of the same name
 Spike, who played "Old Yeller" from the movie Old Yeller
 Radar, the comic Brazil pet dorinha in Monica's Gang
 Raven, the co-star of Ran Schara's Minnesota Bound
 Randolph, the erudite narrator of J.F. Englert's mystery-comedy novel A Dog About Town
 Rowdy, Turk and J.D.'s pet stuffed retriever from the show Scrubs
 Rufus, from the western themed videogame Red Dead Redemption
 Ubu Roi (?–1984), logo and closing credits mascot of Ubu Productions' TV series since 1982
 Vincent, from Lost, played by Madison
 Wowser from Walt Disney's Rascal
 Marley from Marley & Me
 Shadow, the Brenan's black lab from Jonathan Park
 Digger, Cecily King's troublesome dog in Road to Avonlea
 Zuma, a Chocolate Labrador from the children's TV show PAW Patrol
Mr. Peanutbutter, from the show BoJack Horseman is a Yellow Lab
 An unnamed retriever on the cover of Twice Is Not Enough

Mascots and adverts

 The Andrex Puppy, featured primarily in UK television spots for the Andrex brand of toilet paper, known elsewhere as Scott or Kleenex Cottonelle, also featuring the puppy mascot.
 Nigger, a black Labrador, mascot of the Dambusters squadron around 1940. (At the time, in the UK, this name was not seen as an offensive word)
 Zeke the Wonder Dog, mascot and frisbee fanatic for the Michigan State Spartans
 Alien, a black Lab who served as the team mascot for the Memphis Mad Dogs.  Alien would charge the field following each kickoff and retrieve the kicking tee.

Notable individuals in the development of the breed

 The Duke of Buccleuch's black Lab Avon ("Buccleuch Avon", m), considered the foundational dog of the modern breed, along with Buccleuch Ned (both gifts from the Earl of Malmesbury) and the Earl of Malmesbury's dogs Malmesbury Tramp (m) and Malmesbury June (f), all pivotal in the foundation of the modern breed. All date to the 1880s. In particular, Jack Vanderwyk traces the origins of all Chocolate labs listed on the LabradorNet database to Buccleuch Avon and the two Malmesbury dogs.
 Ben of Hyde, first yellow lab on record (kennels of Major C.J. Radclyffe, 1899).

Other
 Adjutant (14 August 1936–20 November 1963), the oldest known Labrador and the seventh-oldest dog whose age has been verified. Age at death: 27 years 3 months. Lived at the Revesby Estate, near Boston, Lincolnshire in England. Birth certificate validated by Guinness World Records 1966.
 Fidèle (or Fidel) (2003–2016), was a tourist attraction in Bruges, Belgium.

Notorious labs
Toby, 75 lbs., who killed 2-year-old Megan Stack, left alone downstairs with the dog, in 1988.
 A 9 to 12-week-old lab killed 2-month-old Zane Earls, who had been left alone in 2008. The dog had not been fed in days and was later put to sleep. The teenage mother of Earls was convicted of manslaughter for leaving her baby unattended in a swing for roughly 2 hours while the puppy was loose in the house.

Notorious Labrador mixes
 Tania, whose 2005 attack on her unconscious owner Isabelle Dinoire led to the world's first partial face transplant.
 Lucky, "Labrador/Golden Retriever mix", who killed two-month-old Aiden McGrew alone in a baby swing in 2012.
 The pair of Labrador/Shepherd mixes, that killed two-year-old Ja'Marr Tiller, alone in his yard in 2012. This was later proven to be a falsehood, as the father was responsible for the murders.

See also
 Detection dog
 Dogs in warfare
 Service dog
 List of individual dogs
 List of police dog breeds

References

External links
 Labradornet.com Hall of Fame
 maartjelabradors.co.uk Details of "Famous Labradors either for their owners or for being in movies or on tv"
 "Origin of Chocolate Lab" - lists a number of labs described as "famous" in its tracing of pedigree routes.
 feilbach.org page covering the 1938 issue of Life, related to Blind of Arden, with full article text.

Labrador Retriever